Burla is a surname. Notable people with the surname include:

Mikhail Burla (born 1957), politician in Transnistria
Oded Burla (1915–2009), Israeli writer, son of Yehuda
Serena Burla (born 1982), American track and field athlete
Yehuda Burla (1886–1969), Israeli writer